Astroball is a platform game for the ZX Spectrum and SAM Coupé, written by Balor Knight and published by Revelation.

A sequel, Turbulence, set on a rotating sphere, was released for the Spectrum in 1993.

Gameplay

The player controls a bouncing ball and collects coins from each level before proceeding to a level's exit. Small spikes, named Deathstars, are to be avoided, as any collision results in a life being lost. The game also features "blinking" platforms, which can only be used for bouncing when visible, requiring careful timing from the player.

Various power-ups can be collected, including extra time, temporary invulnerability, and a slow motion mode. The main power-up item will cycle between the various power-ups available, and its sprite updates accordingly. Most levels require the player to determine the appropriate power-ups to be collected to progress through the level.

Reception

References

External links

Review of the Spectrum version in Your Sinclair
Review of the SAM Coupé version in Your Sinclair

1992 video games
Platform games
SAM Coupé games
Video games developed in the United Kingdom
ZX Spectrum games